Portfolio management may refer to:

Finance 
 Portfolio manager
 Investment management, the professional asset management of various securities

Computing 
 IT portfolio management
 Application portfolio management

Marketing 
 Product portfolio management

See also
 Project management
 Project portfolio management